Archamia is a genus of cardinalfishes native to the Indian Ocean and the western Pacific Ocean.

Species
 Archamia bleekeri (Günther, 1859) (Gon's cardinalfish)

Species formerly in genus Archamia
12 species were formerly assigned to this genus, but have now been moved into Taeniamia:
 Archamia ataenia J. E. Randall & Satapoomin, 1999
 Archamia biguttata Lachner, 1951 (Twinspot cardinalfish)
 Archamia bilineata Gon & J. E. Randall, 1995
 Archamia buruensis (Bleeker, 1856) (Buru cardinalfish)
 Archamia flavofasciata Gon & J. E. Randall, 2003
 Archamia fucata (Cantor, 1849) (Orangelined cardinalfish)
 Archamia leai Waite, 1916 (Lea's cardinalfish)
 Archamia lineolata (G. Cuvier, 1828) (Shimmering cardinal)
 Archamia macroptera (G. Cuvier, 1828) (Dusky-tailed cardinalfish)
 Archamia mozambiquensis J. L. B. Smith, 1961 (Mozambique cardinalfish)
 Archamia pallida Gon & J. E. Randall, 1995
 Archamia zosterophora (Bleeker, 1856) (Blackbelted cardinalfish)

References

Apogonidae
Perciformes genera